Northland Power (TSX: NPI) is a power producer founded in 1987, and publicly traded since 1997. Northland develops, builds, owns and operates clean and green power infrastructure assets in Asia, Europe, Latin America, North America and other selected global jurisdictions that produce electricity from clean-burning natural gas and renewable resources such as wind and solar technology.

The company owns or has a gross economic interest in 2,681 MW of operating generating capacity and 130 MW of generating capacity under construction, representing the La Lucha solar project. In advanced development, Northland has 300 MW of onshore wind under advanced development across three projects in New York State, a 60% equity stake in the 1,044 MW Hai Long project off the coast of Taiwan and a 49% equity stake in the up to 1,200 MW Baltic Power project off the coast of Poland. Northland also operates a regulated utility business in Colombia and has a portfolio of projects in various stages of development in the Americas, Asia and Europe.

Northland's common shares, Series 1, Series 2 and Series 3 preferred shares trade on the Toronto Stock Exchange under the symbols NPI, NPI.PR.A, NPI.PR.B and NPI.PR.C respectively.

Conversion to corporation
In 2009, Northland Power Income Fund acquired and merged with Northland Power Inc. This transaction was motivated by the Government of Canada's elimination of preferential tax treatment for income trusts, which has prompted a mass conversion of Canadian income trusts into regular corporations. On June 21, 2010, Northland's unitholders approved management's plan to convert to a corporation effective January 1, 2011.

Power projects controlled by Northland

Operational power projects

Projects under advanced development and construction

References

External links
 Northland Power Website

Companies listed on the Toronto Stock Exchange
Electric power companies of Canada
Companies based in Toronto